Vishal Mehrotra (27 September 1972 – on or after 29 July 1981) was an eight-year-old boy who was abducted from Putney, London, England, United Kingdom, on 29 July 1981. The child's partial remains were discovered 25 February 1982 on an isolated farm in Sussex. The killers were never identified and no one has ever been charged with the murder.

Background
Vishal Mehrotra was born in India on 27 September 1972, and emigrated to the United Kingdom with his family in 1978. His father, Vishambar Mehrotra, was a solicitor at the time of the disappearance and is now a retired magistrate. His mother, Aruna Mehrotra, had separated from her husband and moved back to India to manage a jewellery business at the time of the disappearance. The family lived on Holmbush Road, Putney, South London. Vishal had a younger sister, who was named Mamta. The children also had a live-in nanny, Joannita Carvalho.

Vishal was described as bright and independent, with an open, friendly personality. He travelled to his school every day on his own.

Day of the disappearance
On 29 July 1981, the day of the wedding of Prince Charles and Lady Diana Spencer, the Mehrotra family took the train into London in order to watch the wedding from the window of Vishambar's workplace. They then took the train back to East Putney, where they arrived around 1:40 PM. Vishambar was tired and went directly home, leaving his son and daughter with Carvalho. He gave each of them 20 pounds to buy sweets.

Carvalho took the children to a newsagent's, where they remained for about twenty minutes. The children had complained of sore throats, so she decided to go buy cough medicine at Putney High Street. Vishal said he was tired and wanted to walk home by himself. Carvalho consented, feeling he was independent enough to make the journey. She took him across the main road pedestrian crossing and then left him to walk the rest of the way while she took Mamta to buy the cough medicine.

Carvalho and Mamta returned home at about 3:00 PM. Vishambar was asleep in bed, but there was no sign of Vishal. Believing he had gone out to play, Carvalho and Mamta took naps until 4:30 PM. When she awoke and found Vishal had still not returned, she explained the situation to his father. The two made enquiries of neighbours to whether they had seen the boy. When they could not find Vishal by 7 PM, he was reported missing to the Metropolitan Police.

Initial investigation
The initial police investigation involved searching the vicinity of the disappearance from the air with a thermal camera, as well as ground searches of common land and the River Thames. Initially it was thought that Vishal could have tried to travel to India, though his family doubted this, and this line of inquiry was investigated by Interpol. Police additionally investigated the possibility that the boy had been abducted by a racist gang. Between the disappearance and the discovery of the body the police investigated hundreds of sightings and interviewed over 14,000 people.

Discovery of the body
On 25 February 1982 two men, who were shooting pigeons, discovered a skull, seven rib bones and a section of vertebrae at Alder Copse, Durleigh Marsh Farm, Rogate, near Petersfield. The bones appeared to have been disturbed by foxes and were found buried in a bog at a depth of around two feet.

Following the discovery, a large scale excavation and search involving about thirty police officers took place. This uncovered more bones, though no clothing was found. The bones were taken to London for forensic investigation. Initially, police believed that the body had been buried around 29 July 1981.

Subsequent investigations
Police initially believed that Vishal may have been abducted by someone with local knowledge of the Durleigh Marsh Farm area.

Links to Sidney Cooke
In the late 1980s, a Metropolitan Police unit that had been investigating suspected serial killer Sidney Cooke's infamous "Dirty Dozen" paedophile ring began to investigate whether Mehrotra could have been another of the gang's victims. The gang was known to have killed at least three similarly-aged boys after abducting them in London in the 1980s, and always abducted them in broad daylight like in Mehrotra's case. It also appeared from Mehrotra's remains that he had been buried naked, indicating a sexual element to the killing. The "Dirty Dozen" investigative team held a meeting with Sussex Police at the time but no concrete evidence was found to link the enquiries.

In March 2015, the BBC reported that the Metropolitan Police had referred itself to the Independent Police Complaints Commission following allegations of corruption in relation to the case. Subsequently, in May 2015, Sussex Police released documents relating to a review of the murder they had carried out in 2005. The force's report on the case revealed that other police forces had in fact investigated links between Mehrotra's death and Sidney Cooke's gang on three occasions. The report also revealed that the Metropolitan Police's paedophile unit had concluded there were "strong similarities" between Mehrota's case and the gang's known killings. It is known that some members of the gang had boasted in prison of killing an 'Asian boy', and it was reported in 2015 that investigators were now looking into whether this could have been Mehrotra.

Roger Stoodley, who retired as the detective leading the Cooke investigation in 1992, stated in 2014 that the disappearances of Vishal and Martin Allen were in keeping with the modus operandi of Cooke's paedophile gang.

Operation Midland 

A few months after his son's disappearance, Vishambar Mehrotra claimed to have been contacted by an unidentified man thought to be in his twenties. This man suggested that Vishal's abduction had been connected to a group of influential paedophiles associated with Elm Guest House. The man stated that he had informed the Metropolitan Police but they had not followed up his report. Vishambar gave a recording of the telephone conversation to detectives; however, they dismissed it as a prank call and it was not followed up. The location of Vishal's disappearance was less than a mile from Elm Guest House.

Vishal's murder was investigated as part of Operation Midland after Carl Beech, a purported abuse survivor, told detectives that he had been abused by a paedophile ring and he had seen them murder three boys. Beech was later determined to have used his work computer to access newspaper articles speculating on connections between Vishal's murder and the alleged paedophile ring. In July 2019 he was convicted of charges related to lying to police and he was jailed for eighteen years.

See also 
List of kidnappings
List of solved missing person cases
List of unsolved murders
Murder of Claire Woolterton – another 1981 abduction and murder of a child in west London, solved in 2013 
Murder of Daniel Handley – a similar 1994 murder of a boy
Murder of Lindsay Rimer – unsolved 1994 case in which a 13-year-old British girl disappeared from Yorkshire and was found one year later in a nearby canal
Disappearance of Suzy Lamplugh – unsolved abduction that occurred near to Mehrotra's in 1986

References

1980s missing person cases
1981 in London
1981 murders in the United Kingdom
1980s crimes in London
British Hindus
Formerly missing people
Incidents of violence against boys
Kidnapped Indian children
Missing person cases in England
Unsolved murders in England
Indian people murdered abroad
Murdered Indian children
Deaths by person in London